Andrea Bramhall is a British writer. Her novel Clean Slate won the Lambda Literary Award for Lesbian Romance. She's also been a finalist for the Lambda Literary Award for Lesbian Romance twice and Lambda Literary Award for Lesbian Mystery twice.

Biography 
Bramhall was born in Stockport, England, though she currently lives in Norfolk with her partner.

Bramhill received a Bachelor of Arts in Contemporary Arts from Manchester Metropolitan University in 2002.

Awards

Publications 

 Clean Slate (2013)
 Nightingale (2014)
 The Chameleon's Tale (2015)
 Just My Luck (2016)
 Rock and a Hard Place (2017)
 Lost for Words (2018)

Finnsbury series 

 Ladyfish (2012)
 Swordfish (2015)

Norfolk Coast Investigation series 

 Collide-O-Scope (2016)
 Under Parr (2017)
 The Last First Time (2017)

Anthology contributions 

 L Is For: A UK Lesfic Anthology, edited by Jayne Fereday (2014)
 Language of Love, edited by Astrid Ohletz and Lee  Winter (2018)

References 

Alumni of Manchester Metropolitan University
Lambda Literary Award winners
Living people
21st-century British writers
Year of birth missing (living people)